The Monongahela National Forest is a national forest located in the Allegheny Mountains of eastern West Virginia, USA.

The Monongahela National Forest includes some major landform features such as the Allegheny Front and the western portion of the Ridge-and-valley Appalachians. Within the forest boundaries lie some of the highest mountain peaks in the state, including the highest, Spruce Knob (4,863 ft). Spruce Knob is also the highest point in the Allegheny Mountains. Approximately 75 tree species are found in the forest. Almost all of the trees are a second growth forest, grown back after the land was heavily cut over around the start of the 20th century. Species for which the forest is important include red spruce (Picea rubens), balsam fir (Abies balsamea), and mountain ash (Sorbus americana).

The Monongahela National Forest includes eight U.S. Wilderness Areas and several special-use areas, notably the Spruce Knob–Seneca Rocks National Recreation Area.

Administration
The main administrative headquarters is located in Elkins, West Virginia. The Monongahela also includes four ranger districts. The forest includes 105 permanent employees, seasonal employees, and volunteers. 

Monongahela National Forest is currently divided into four ranger districts. The Cheat-Potomac and Marlinton-White Sulphur Springs were formed by combining their namesake districts; in the merged districts, the offices for both original districts were retained.
 Cheat-Potomac Ranger District, Headquarters: Parsons, West Virginia
 Office (former HQ, Potomac Ranger District) at Petersburg, West Virginia
 Gauley Ranger District, Headquarters: Richwood, West Virginia
 Greenbrier Ranger District, Headquarters: Bartow, West Virginia
 Marlinton-White Sulphur Springs Ranger District, Headquarters: Marlinton, West Virginia
 Office (former HQ, White Sulphur Springs Ranger District) at White Sulphur Springs, West Virginia

History
The Monongahela National Forest was established following the Weeks Act passage in 1911. This act authorized the purchase of land for long-term watershed protection and natural resource management following the massive cutting of the eastern forests in the late 19th and early 20th centuries. In 1915,  were acquired to begin the forest, called the "Monongahela Purchase", and on April 28, 1920, it became the "Monongahela National Forest".

Although white-tail deer never vanished from the Monongahela National Forest, from the 1890s to the 1920s their numbers dropped substantially. In January 1930, eight deer procured from Michigan were released into the forest near Parsons. From 1937 to 1939, a total of 17 more deer were released in the Flatrock-Roaring Plains area of the Forest. These releases served as the nucleus for reestablishing the healthy breeding populations of eastern West Virginia. (By the mid-1940s, deer were so numerous in the area that crop farmers had to patrol their fields by night.)

In 1943 and 1944, as part of the West Virginia Maneuver Area, the U.S. Army used parts of the Monongahela National Forest as a practice artillery and mortar range and maneuver area before troops were sent to Europe to fight in World War II. Artillery and mortar shells shot into the area for practice are still occasionally found there today. Seneca Rocks and other area cliffs were also used for assault climbing instruction. This was the Army's only low-altitude climbing school.

The fisher (Pekania pennanti), believed to have been exterminated in the state by 1912, was reintroduced during the winter of 1969. At that time 23 fishers were translocated from New Hampshire to two sites within the boundaries of the Monongahela National Forest (at Canaan Mountain in Tucker County and Cranberry Glades in Pocahontas County).

In 1980, and again in 2005, the Monongahela National Forest was the venue for the annual counterculture Rainbow Gathering.

In 1993, the Craig Run East Fork Rockshelter and Laurel Run Rockshelter in the Gauley Ranger District were listed on the National Register of Historic Places.

Statistics and general information

General
 Land area: over 
 Wilderness areas: 
 Roads: 
 Visitor centers: 2 (Cranberry Mountain Nature Center and Seneca Rocks Discovery Center)
 Designated Scenic Areas: 3
 Visitor observation towers: 2 (Bickle Knob Tower and Olson Tower)
 Picnic areas: 17
 Campgrounds: 23
 Snowmobile areas: 1 (Highland Scenic Highway)
 Wildlife management areas (managed with West Virginia Division of Natural Resources): 10
 Warm-water fishing steams: 
 Trout streams: 
 Impoundments (reservoirs): 5

Trails
 Trails: 825 miles (1,327 km)
 Outside Wilderness Areas: 660 miles (1,062 km), not counting the 3 newest wildernesses
 In Wilderness Areas: 165 miles (265 km), not counting the 3 newest wildernesses

Natural features
 Wilderness areas: 8

Sensitive species
 Sensitive plants and wildlife: 50
 Threatened and endangered species: 9

Geography
The Monongahela National Forest encompasses most of the southern third of the Allegheny Mountains range (a section of the vast Appalachian Mountains range) and is entirely within the state of West Virginia.

Headwaters of six major river systems are located within the forest: Monongahela, Potomac, Greenbrier, Elk, Tygart, and Gauley. Twelve rivers are currently under study for possible inclusion in the National Wild and Scenic Rivers System.

Ecology
The forest is noted for its rugged landscape, views, blueberry thickets, highland bogs and "sods", and open areas with exposed rocks. In addition to the second-growth forest trees, the wide range of botanical species found includes rhododendron, laurel on the moist west side of the Allegheny Front, and cactus and endemic shale barren species on the drier eastern slopes.

There are 230 known species of birds inhabiting the Monongahela National Forest: 159 are known to breed there, 89 are Neotropical migrants; 71 transit the forest during migration, but do not breed there, and 17 non-breeding species are Neotropical. The Brooks Bird Club (BBC) conducts an annual bird banding and survey project in the vicinity of Dolly Sods Scenic Area during migration (August - September). The forest provides habitat for 9 federally listed endangered or threatened species: 2 bird species, 2 bat species, 1 subspecies of flying squirrel, 1 salamander species, and 3 plant species. Fifty other species of rare/sensitive plants and animals also occur in the forest.

Larger animals and game species found in the forest include black bear, wild turkey, white-tailed deer, gray and fox squirrels, rabbits, snowshoe hare, woodcock, and grouse. Limited waterfowl habitat exists in certain places. Furbearers include beaver, red and gray fox, bobcat, fisher, river otter, raccoon and mink. Other hunted species include coyotes, skunks, opossums, woodchucks, crows, and weasels. There are 12 species of game (pan) fish and 60 species of nongame or forage fish. Some 90% of the trout waters of West Virginia are within the forest.

Recreation
The Monongahela National Forest is a recreation destination and tourist attraction, hosting approximately 3 million visitors annually. The backwoods road and trail system is used for hiking, mountain biking, horse riding. Many miles of railroad grades are a link in the recreation use of the forest. Recreation ranges from self-reliant treks in the wildernesses and backcountry areas, to rock climbing challenges, to traditional developed-site camping. Canoeing, hunting, trapping, fishing, and wildlife viewing are also common uses.

Campgrounds
The following are developed campgrounds in the  forest:

 Bear Heaven Campground
 Big Bend Campground
 Big Rock Campground
 Bird Run Campground
 Bishop Knob Campground
 Blue Bend Recreation Area and Campground
 Cranberry Campground
 Cranberry River Sites
 Day Run Campground
 Gatewood Group Camp
 Horseshoe Campground
 Island Campground
 Jess Judy Group Campground
 Lake Sherwood Recreation Area and Campground
 Laurel Fork Campground
 Middle Mountain Cabins
 Pocahontas Campground
 Red Creek Campground
 Seneca Shadows Campground
 Spruce Knob Lake Campground
 Stuart Campground
 Stuart Group Campground
 Summit Lake Campground
 Tea Creek Campground
 Williams River sites

Commercial resources
The forest administration maintains wildlife and timber programs aimed at the responsible management of a mixed-age forest. About 81 percent of the total forest area is closed canopy forest over 60 years of age. The tree species most valuable for timber and wildlife food in the Monongahela National Forest are black cherry and oaks. The forest's commercial timber sale program averages 30 mbf (thousand board feet) of timber sold per year with a yearly average value of $7.5 million. Regeneration cuts (clear-cuts or other treatments designed to start a new timber stand) occur on approximately  yearly out of the more than  forest total.

Mineral resources located in the Monongahela National Forest include coal, gas, limestone, and gravel.

Receipts for timber, grazing, land uses, minerals, and recreation use averaged $4,840,466 annually between FY92 and FY96, and 25% of that (an average of $1,210,116 per year) was returned to counties that include Monongahela National Forest lands. This money is intended for use by local schools and roads. The remaining 75% each year is returned to the U.S. Treasury.

Areas of interest within the Monongahela National Forest

Spruce Knob–Seneca Rocks National Recreation Area
 Spruce Knob
 Seneca Rocks
 River Knobs
 Spruce Knobs lake
 Sites Homestead
 Smoke Hole Canyon

U.S. Wilderness Areas
 Big Draft Wilderness, 
 Cranberry Wilderness, 
 Dolly Sods Wilderness, 
 Laurel Fork North Wilderness, 
 Laurel Fork South Wilderness, 
 Otter Creek Wilderness, 
 Roaring Plains West Wilderness, 
 Mount Porte Crayon
 Spice Run Wilderness,

Registered National Natural Landmarks

 Big Run Bog
 Blister Run Swamp
 Canaan Valley
 Cranberry Glades Botanical Area
 Fisher Spring Run Bog
 Gaudineer Scenic Area
 Germany Valley Karst Area
 Shavers Mountain Spruce-Hemlock Stand
 Sinnett-Thorn Mountain Cave System

Sites listed on the National Register of Historic Places

NB: Only sites actually on USFS land are listed here.
 Rohrbaugh Cabin
 Craig Run East Fork Rockshelter
 Laurel Run Rockshelter
 Sites Homestead

Stands of old-growth forest
Some  of true old-growth forest have been documented within the Monongahela National Forest. The largest of these areas are:
 Fanny Bennett Hemlock Grove, a  eastern hemlock stand
 Gaudineer Scenic Area, 50 acres of virgin red spruce forest
 North Fork Mountain Red Pine Botanical Area, 10 acres of red pine old growth forest
 North Spruce Mountain Old Growth Site, about 
 Shavers Mountain Spruce-Hemlock Stand, a  red spruce-hemlock stand, partly in the Otter Creek Wilderness
 Virgin White Pine Botanical Area, a  white pine stand

Other features
 Fernow Experimental Forest
 Lake Sherwood
 Summit Lake
 Falls of Hills Creek
 Highland Scenic Highway
 Williams River
 Stuart Memorial Drive
 Flatrock Plains
 Sinks of Gandy Creek

Gallery

See also
 High Allegheny National Park and Preserve, a proposed National Park Service unit that would have encompassed the northern part of Monongahela National Forest

References

Citations

Other sources
 McKim, C.R. (1970), Monongahela National Forest History, Unpublished manuscript available at the Monongahela National Forest Office, Elkins, West Virginia.
 de Hart, Allen and Bruce Sundquist (2006), Monongahela National Forest Hiking Guide, 8th edition, West Virginia Highlands Conservancy, Charleston, West Virginia.
 Berman, Gillian Mace, Melissa Conley-Spencer, Barbara J. Howe and Charlene Lattea (1992), The Monongahela National Forest: 1915-1990, Morgantown, West Virginia: WVU Public History Program; For the United States Forest Service: Monongahela National Forest. (March 1992)
 DeMeo, Tom and Julie Concannon (1996), "On the Mon: Image and Substance in West Virginia's National Forest", Inner Voice, Vol. 8, Issue 1, January/February.
 Weitzman, Sidney (1977), Lessons from the Monongahela Experience, USDA, Forest Service, December.
 This article contains information that originally came from US Government publications and websites and is in the public domain.

External links

 Monongahela National Forest Webpage on the USDA Forest Service Website
 Recreation.Gov Page

 
National Forests of West Virginia
National Forests of the Appalachians
Allegheny Mountains
Protected areas of Grant County, West Virginia
Protected areas of Greenbrier County, West Virginia
Protected areas of Nicholas County, West Virginia
Protected areas of Pendleton County, West Virginia
Protected areas of Pocahontas County, West Virginia
Protected areas of Preston County, West Virginia
Protected areas of Randolph County, West Virginia
Protected areas of Tucker County, West Virginia
Protected areas of Webster County, West Virginia
Campgrounds in West Virginia
Protected areas established in 1920
1920 establishments in West Virginia